János Statileo, also known as John Statilius (died in 1542), was the Roman Catholic bishop of Transylvania in the Kingdom of Hungary from 1534 to 1542. He took care of the education of his orphaned nephew, Antun Vrančić—the future archbishop of Esztergom—as ward. After the 1526 Battle of Mohács, Hungary was plunged into a civil war between two kings, John Zápolya and Ferdinand of Habsburg. Statileo was Zápolya's loyal supporter and diplomat. Along with George Martinuzzi, Bishop of Várad (now Oradea in Romania), and Franjo Frankopan, Archbishop of Kalocsa, Statileo was the main organizer of a religious debate between Catholic and Evangelical clerics in Segesvár (Sighișoara, Romania) in 1538. After Statileo's death, the Diet of Hungary confiscated the Transylvanian bishopric's revenues in favor of the royal family and the episcopal see was left vacant for a decade.

References

Sources

16th-century Roman Catholic bishops in Hungary
Bishops of Transylvania